"Cool" is a 2015 song by a Swedish electronic musician Alesso featuring vocals from American singer Roy English (also known by his real name Brandon Wronski), the frontman of the former American rock band Eye Alaska. It premiered on February 13, 2015 on BBC Radio 1. The track, which samples Kylie Minogue's "Get Outta My Way", was officially released in Europe on 16 February 2015 and in North America on 17 February 2015. The song was released on 26 April 2015 in the UK.

The cover art references his single "Tear The Roof Up" as the locker reads "Tear The Roof Up!"

Music video
A music video for the song was commissioned. It was produced by Emil Nava, and was filmed at Venice High School, where the films Grease and American History X and the music video for Britney Spears' "...Baby One More Time", were filmed. Contrary to his anonymous DJ contemporaries, Alesso himself plays the protagonist, a long-haired, bespectacled nerd who is initially mocked by his fellow students but absconds to the dance class, where he encounters an attractive brunette teacher (Claude Racine) with whom he falls in love. About two-thirds of the way through the music video, his infatuation invokes amorous thoughts involving her dancing in a bra and knickers on a bench, a nod to the music video for Van Halen's "Hot for Teacher". These thoughts are interspersed with another man showing him how to dance properly using films containing dance moves. Alesso then uses a school dance to attract the teacher and then dump her with a smile in the middle of the dance floor.

Critical reception
Krystal Spencer of Your EDM described the music video as "a riot to watch Alesso slide and spin through high school in the hopes of impressing his teacher", further commenting that "fans will love seeing a different side of Alesso".

Track listings and formats
Digital download - single
 "Cool" (featuring Roy English) - 3:41

Digital download - EP (Remixes)
 "Cool" (Extended Version) - 5:33
 "Cool" (A-Trak Remix) - 4:44
 "Cool" (Autograf Remix) - 5:40
 "Cool" (Sonny Alven Remix) - 3:47
 "Cool" (CRNKN Remix) - 4:38
 "Cool" (Sweater Beats Remix) - 3:26

Charts

Weekly charts

Year-end charts

Certifications

References

2014 songs
Alesso songs
Songs written by Alesso
Songs written by Lucas Secon
Songs written by Cutfather
Songs written by Peter Wallevik
Def Jam Recordings singles
2015 singles
Songs written by Damon Sharpe
Songs written by Daniel Davidsen
Song recordings produced by Alesso